Disques Victoire is a Canadian independent record label established in 1990 by Serge Brouillette in St-Césaire, Quebec specializing in recording and promoting French language artists.

Notable artists
 Mes Aïeux
 Sylvain Cossette
 Luc De Larochellière
 Julie Masse
 Marie Denise Pelletier

See also
 List of record labels
 List of Quebec record labels
 List of Quebec musicians
 Music of Quebec
 Culture of Quebec

External links
 Disques Victoire Official site

Canadian independent record labels
Quebec record labels
Pop record labels